Now Deh (also known as Noudi and Noudy) is a village in Khvoresh Rostam-e Shomali Rural District, Khvoresh Rostam District, Khalkhal County, Ardabil Province, Iran. At the 2006 census, its population was 136, in 51 families.

References 

Towns and villages in Khalkhal County